Boorelu is the traditional Indian sweet in the Telugu festivals. It is made of rice flour stuffed with jaggery mixed dal paste and dry fruits. It is often served hot with ghee. It is called Poornalu in Telangana and Andhra Pradesh. Poornalu follows the traditional methods common to all South Indian cuisines. Poornalu is traditionally prepared using a rice-urad dal batter, and then packed with some shredded dry fruits and channa dal mixture called aspoornam and it is then deep-fried in oil until golden brown.

History

The first occurrence of Poornalu is not known. However it has been an integral part of the menu in most Telugu festivals and occasions. Like most other Telugu dishes, Poornalu also uses urad dal as its main ingredient since in Southern India; urad dal has long been the most commonly grown pulse.

Serving

Poornalu is mostly served after the main course and rarely as an evening snack in most Telugu households. Often Poornalu is served along with ghee to enhance its flavour. Preferably it is better consumed hot. It is made in abundance during the famous Makar Sankranti - the festival of harvest. During this time, poornalu is made exuberantly and most heartily and distributed among friends, relatives and neighbours. Poornalu is often served at weddings and other festivities. The preparation and serving of poornalu, however, undergoes minor alterations from place to place.

Also Known as

Poornalu is also called suyyam, seeyam, sukiyan, sugeelu or sugunta in various parts of Southern India. It is also often termed as Poornam, Boorelu in Andhra Pradesh, and Telangana and Poornalu seems to be the shortened form of it.

See also
 List of stuffed dishes

References

Telangana cuisine
Andhra cuisine
Indian desserts
Stuffed dishes